Chloë Bass (born 1984) is an American conceptual artist who works in performance and social practice. Bass' work focuses on intimacy. She was a founding co-lead organizer of Arts in Bushwick from 2007-2011, the group that organizes Bushwick Open Studios. She is an Assistant Professor of Art and Social Practice at Queens College, CUNY, and holds a BA from Yale University and an MFA from Brooklyn College. Bass was a regular contributor to Hyperallergic until 2018.

Early life and education 
Bass was born in New York City in 1984 and lived on the Upper West Side. In 2002, she moved to New Haven to pursue a BA in Theatre Studies at Yale University. Two labor strikes in 2003, including a dining hall workers' strike, strongly affected Bass' undergraduate experience and influenced her later involvement with organizing.

She completed her MFA in Performance and Interactive Media at Brooklyn College in 2011.

Career 
Bass moved to Bushwick in 2006. In Bushwick she became a co-lead organizer of Arts in Bushwick (2007-2011), and helped to organize Bushwick Open Studios, a project of which she is now critical, saying that "ultimately the damaging effect [of BOS] has been greater than the fun." While living in that part of Brooklyn in a loft, Bass worked to register the area's voters and, as a result of a displacement mapping project, gained a seat on Community Board 4, which she held until 2012. 

In 2011, Bass moved to an apartment in Bed-Stuy, where she currently lives. In 2014 she was the Create Change resident for the Laundromat Project in Bed-Stuy, creating a work called The Department of Local Affairs. For this work she collected information in the form of writing, drawing, and conversation by and for locals, examining what this looked like in contrast to information collected by companies for advertising or tourism.

Bass' eight-chapter project from 2015 to 2017 exploring individual social interactions, The Book of Everyday Instruction, has been presented at the Museum of Modern Art (MoMA) and other venues. Chapters from this work have included creating poetic installations in bathrooms and inviting gallery goers to smell jars of spice. Her work has been exhibited at the Elizabeth Foundation for the Arts, Cooper Union, The Bronx Museum of the Arts, the Neuberger Museum of Art, The Knockdown Center, and Momenta Art, amongst other venues. She is the recipient of residencies at The Laundromat Project, Bemis Center, Triangle Arts Association, and Lower Manhattan Cultural Counsel (LMCC) Workspace residency, and was nominated for the Rema Hort Mann Foundation Grant.

In 2019 the Studio Museum in Harlem commissioned her first institutional solo exhibition, Wayfinding (2019) at St. Nicholas Park.

References

External links
 
 

1984 births
African-American women artists
African-American contemporary artists
American contemporary artists
American performance artists
American women artists
Artists from New York City
Brooklyn College alumni
Living people
People from the Upper West Side
Queens College, City University of New York faculty
Yale College alumni
African-American women musicians
21st-century African-American people
21st-century African-American women
20th-century African-American people
20th-century African-American women